Bui Tuong Phong (December 14, 1942 – July 1975) was a Vietnamese-born computer graphics researcher and pioneer. He invented the widely used Phong shading algorithm and Phong reflection model.

Life
Phong was born in Hanoi, then French Indochina. After attending the Lycée Albert Sarraut there, he moved with his family to Saigon in 1954, where he attended the Lycée Jean Jacques Rousseau. He went to France in 1964 and was admitted to the Grenoble Institute of Technology. He received his  from Grenoble in 1966 and his Diplôme d'Ingénieur from the ENSEEIHT, Toulouse, in 1968.

He went to the University of Utah College of Engineering in September 1971 as a research assistant in Computer Science and he received his Ph.D. from the University of Utah in 1973.

Phong knew that he was terminally ill with leukemia while he was a student. In 1975, after his tenure at the University of Utah, Phong joined Stanford University as a professor.

Phong was married to Bùi Thị Ngọc Bích from Nha Trang, Vietnam, in 1969 in Paris, France. He and his wife had one daughter.

According to Professor Ivan Sutherland and Phong's friends, Phong was intelligent, affable and modest. About improving the quality of synthesized images he wrote, "We do not expect to be able to display the object exactly as it would appear in reality, with texture, overcast shadows, etc. We hope only to display an image that approximates the real object closely enough to provide a certain degree of realism."

Two years after receiving his Ph.D., Phong died in 1975 of end-stage leukemia.

Work on computer graphics

Phong was the inventor of the Phong reflection model and the Phong shading interpolation method, techniques widely used in computer graphics. He published the description of the algorithms in his 1973 PhD dissertation and a 1975 paper.

He developed the first algorithm for simulating specular phenomena.  When working on his doctorate, he was very focused on selecting a topic and completing his dissertation very fast. Professor David C. Evans very enthusiastically supported him in this project. Professor Ivan Sutherland worked with him for improving the previous Mach banding problems, and on using normals for shading. His fellow students also supported him very much, including James H. Clark, Franklin C. Crow, George Randall, Dennis Ting and John Riley. He finished his dissertation much faster than other students of the time did.

Phong, Robert McDermott, Jim Clark and Raphael Rom had created the very first computer graphics generated picture that looked like its physical model: the Volkswagen Beetle. As a computer graphics icon, it still crops up in highly respected journals and animated features.

See also 
 Blinn–Phong shading model

References 

1942 births
1975 deaths
Computer graphics researchers
People from Hanoi
Vietnamese expatriates in the United States
Vietnamese academics
Vietnamese scientists
University of Utah alumni
Deaths from leukemia
Deaths from cancer in California
People educated at Lycee Albert Sarraut